May Creek Airport  is a state owned, public use airport located one nautical mile (2 km) south of the central business district of May Creek, in the Valdez-Cordova Census Area of the U.S. state of Alaska. Scheduled passenger service is subsidized by the Essential Air Service program.

The Federal Aviation Administration recorded 28 passenger boardings (enplanements) in the calendar year 2008, 18 in 2009 and 8 in 2010. It was included in the National Plan of Integrated Airport Systems for 2011–2015, which categorized it as a general aviation airport.

Facilities and aircraft
May Creek Airport has one runway designated 13/31 with a turf and gravel surface measuring 2,700 by 100 feet (823 x 30 m). For the 12-month period ending December 31, 2005, the airport had 350 aircraft operations, an average of 29 per month: 57% general aviation and 43% air taxi.

Airlines and destinations

References

Other sources

 Essential Air Service documents (Docket DOT-OST-1995-492) from the U.S. Department of Transportation:
 Order 2003-3-16 (March 20, 2003): tentatively re-selecting Ellis Air Taxi, Inc., to provide essential air service at Gulkana, May Creek and, McCarthy, Alaska, for the two-year period from February 1, 2003, through January 31, 2005, at a combined annual subsidy of $231,101.
 Order 2005-3-14 (March 8, 2005): tentatively re-selecting Ellis Air Taxi, Inc., to provide essential air service at Gulkana, May Creek and, McCarthy, Alaska, for the two-year period from February 1, 2005, through January 31, 2007, at a combined annual subsidy of $339,356.
 Order 2006-11-23 (November 27, 2006): re-selecting Ellis Air Taxi, Inc., to provide essential air service (EAS) at Gulkana, May Creek, and McCarthy, Alaska, for the two-year period beginning February 1, 2007, at an annual subsidy rate of $392,174.
 Order 2008-12-19 (December 29, 2008): selecting Ellis Air Taxi, Inc. d/b/a Copper Valley Air Service, to continue providing essential air service (EAS) at Gulkana, May Creek and McCarthy, Alaska, for a new two-year period, through January 31, 2011, and establishing a combined subsidy rate of $424,652 annually.
 Order 2010-12-8 (December 6, 2010): re-selecting Ellis Air Taxi Inc. d/b/a Copper Valley Air Service, to provide subsidized essential air service (EAS) at Gulkana, May Creek, and McCarthy, Alaska, for the two-year period beginning February 1, 2011, at the annual subsidy rates of $262,220 for Gulkana, and $176,692 for both May Creek and McCarthy.
 Order 2012-11-34 (November 30, 2012): re-selecting Copper Valley Air Service to provide subsidized Essential Air Service (EAS) at Gulkana, May Creek, and McCarthy, Alaska, for the two-year period beginning February 1, 2013, at the annual subsidy rates of $269,189 for Gulkana (six-seat twin engine Piper PA-31 aircraft and operate two nonstop round trips each week year-round to Anchorage), and $206,198 for both May Creek and McCarthy (two nonstop or one-stop round trips per week to Gulkana using three-seat Cessna 185 aircraft during winter months and four-seat Cessna 206 aircraft during summer months).

External links
 Topographic map from USGS The National Map
 FAA Alaska airport diagram (GIF)

Airports in Copper River Census Area, Alaska
Essential Air Service